The 2015 World Archery Championships was the 48th edition of the event. It was held in Copenhagen, Denmark from 26 July to 2 August 2015 and was organised by World Archery Federation (formerly known as FITA). Qualification and elimination rounds took place at the Sundby Idrætspark, with the medal matches on 1–2 August outside the Danish Parliament building Christiansborg Palace. The competition was preceded by the World Archery Congress on 24–25 July.

The programme featured was the same as previous World Championships, with individual, team, and mixed team events in the compound and recurve disciplines. A record number of athletes has entered: 623 archers across the four disciplines. As well as participation, the Championships also broke public engagement and awareness records.

The competition was also the first opportunity for recurve athletes to secure qualification for their NOCs at the 2016 Summer Olympics. An Olympic Secondary Tournament was held to rank finishers for the purposes of Olympic qualification.

Schedule
All times are local (UTC+01:00).

Medals table

Medals summary

Recurve

Compound

Participating nations
At the close of registrations, a record 96 nations had registered 623 athletes. Nations in bold sent the maximum number of participants, with a full team in each event. In the event, several nations and archers did not use registered places. The final number of participants was 590 from 90 countries.

  (6)
  (5)
  (3)
  (12)
  (10)
  (2)
  (9)
  (6)
  (9)
  (6)
  (2)
  (12)
  (4)
  (12)
  (3)
  (3)
  (6)
  (6)
  (12)
  (4)
  (2)
  (2)
  (8)
  (12) (host) 
  (7)
  (4)
  (6)
  (1)
  (11)
  (12)
  (4)
  (5)
  (12)
  (7)
  (4)
  (3)
  (11)
  (12)
  (11)
  (12)
  (2)
  (5)
  (5)
  (12)
  (4)
  (8)
  (10)
  (6)
  (12)
  (3)
  (1)
  (3)
  (2)
  (6)
  (2)
  (2)
  (6)
  (2)
  (12)
  (2)
  (6)
  (3)
  (12)
  (1)
  (4)
  (12)
  (6)
  (12)
  (8)
  (3)
  (4)
  (3)
  (6)
  (12)
  (1)
  (4)
  (2)
  (6)
  (8)
  (10)
  (8)
  (4)
  (12)
  (11)
  (1)
  (3)
  (2)
  (12)
  (3)
  (1)
  (12)
  (12)
  (12)
  (3)
  (6)
  (12)
  (5)
  (1)

References

External links
 Official website
 Championships details
 Championships results

 
World Championship
World Archery
World Archery Championships
World Archery Championships
International sports competitions in Copenhagen
International archery competitions hosted by Denmark
2015